Tomas Pontén (born Carl Axel Thomas Pontén; 29 January 1946 – 15 September 2015) was a Swedish actor and director.

Biography
Pontén was born in Skövde, Sweden and was the son of colonel Birger Pontén and Ellen, née Nordlöf. He was younger brother to the doctor Jan Pontén and fashion designer Gunilla Pontén. He was also the nephew of engineer Ruben Pontén and cousin of actor Gunvor Pontén. He passed his student examination in 1967 and studied at Statens scenskola in Stockholm from 1969 to 1972. Pontén worked at the Royal Dramatic Theatre ("Dramaten") from 1972.

Personal life
Pontén never married but was partners from 1983 to 2000 with Suzanne Reuter. They had three sons. Pontén died on 15 September 2015 after a long illness.

Selected filmography

Film
1975 - The White Wall
1976 - Near and Far Away
1979 - Gå på vattnet om du kan
1994 - Sommarmord
1999 - Dödsklockan
2001 - Sprängaren
2002 - Olivia Twist (TV)
2004 - Hotet

TV
1977 - Ärliga blå ögon
1979 - Selambs
1980 - Zoo Story
1983 - Colombe
1983 - Profitörerna
1989 - Det var då...
1992 - The Emperor of Portugallia
1995 – Radioskugga (also in 1997)
1999 - Browalls
2000 - Skärgårdsdoktorn
2002 - Olivia Twist

Plays
2005 – The Provost in Measure for Measure by William Shakespeare, directed by Yannis Houvardas, Royal Dramatic Theatre

References

External links

1946 births
2015 deaths
Swedish male actors
People from Skövde Municipality
Swedish film directors